The Supercup of Bosnia and Hezegovina is a discontinued football competition. It was contested between the league champion and the cup winner of the previous season. It was first contested in the 1996–97 season and has not been held since the 2000–01 season.

Winners

In the following years, clubs could not find an appropriate date to play the Supercup, although the Football Association is trying to make it more popular by suggesting it should be played before the season, as a curtain raiser.

External links
Cup history at RSSSF.com

S
Bosnia-Herzegovina
Defunct sports competitions in Bosnia and Herzegovina